Don B. Hughes (born September 22, 1940) in Salisbury in Wicomico County, Maryland, United States, was a member of the Maryland House of Delegates for District 37A, which covers portions of Dorchester and Wicomico Counties

Background
Delegate Hughes was first elected in 1994 and only served for 1 term. He did not run for reelection in the House.

Education
Delegate Hughes attended Wicomico High School in Salisbury, Maryland.  After high school he graduated from the University of Delaware in Newark, Delaware.

Career
Delegate Hughes served on the Environmental Matters Committee during his term in the Maryland House of Delegates.  He was also a member of the forum for Rural Maryland, the Lead Poisoning Prevention Commission from 1996 until 1998, the Governor's Wetlands Restoration Steering Committee from 1997 until 1999, and finally the Solid Waste Management Task Force in 1998.

Election results
1994 Race for Maryland House of Delegates – District 37A
Voters to choose one:
{| class="wikitable"
|-
!Name
!Votes
!Percent
!Outcome
|-
|-
|Don B. Hughes, Rep.
|2,788
|  41%
|   Won
|-
|-
|Rudolph C. Cane, Dem.
|2,768
|  40%
|   Lost
|-
|-
|Lemuel D. Chester II, Ind.
|1,299
|  19%
|   Lost
|}

References and notes

External links
 Maryland Archives

1940 births
Republican Party members of the Maryland House of Delegates
University of Delaware alumni
Living people
People from Salisbury, Maryland